The Revolution of 1904 was a civic-military revolt led by Aparicio Saravia against the government of José Batlle y Ordóñez in Uruguay. It was the last military conflict between Blancos and Colorados.

History 
It was the bloodiest of the revolutions that occurred in Uruguay, with large numbers of casualties and injuries on both sides. On June 6, 1904, took place the Battle of Guayabos (Salto Department), in which the saravista colonel Abelardo Márquez, was defeated by government troops.

In the Battle of Tupambaé, General Aparicio Saravia faced the troops of General Pablo Galarza in the department of Cerro Largo. Saravia was wounded during the Battle of Masoller, and died several days later in Santana do Livramento, Brazil. The armistice was signed on September 24, 1904.

Several sons of Aparicio Saravia fought in the ranks of the revolutionary army. His brother Basilicio Saravia, served in the government army.

Gallery

References 

Battles involving Uruguay
Conflicts in 1904
History of Uruguay
1904 in Uruguay